Pearl Slattery (born 11 April 1989) is an Irish football coach and player who is a defender for Women's National League club Shelbourne.

Club career
Slattery is from Dublin and grew up in Rialto. She played football with Fatima Boys, Templeogue United, St Catherine's and Raheny United before moving to play college soccer with Hutchinson Blue Dragons in 2010. After 29 goals in 42 appearances, Slattery left Hutchinson for the Clayton State Lakers in 2012, where she scored twice in 15 appearances.

In 2013 Slattery returned to Raheny United to play in the Women's National League. She remained with the club in their new guise as Shelbourne for the 2015–16 season, while also training as a coach and working for the Football Association of Ireland. When club captain Slattery re-signed for Shelbourne ahead of the 2022 season, she was one of the Women's National League's all-time most decorated players.

Personal life
In 2020 Slattery was in a relationship with Siobhán Killeen. Slattery's mother Patricia McCann is a playwright.

References

External links

1989 births
Living people
Republic of Ireland women's association footballers
Women's association football defenders
Women's National League (Ireland) players
Raheny United F.C. players
Shelbourne F.C. (women) players
St Catherine's L.F.C. players
Association footballers from Dublin (city)
LGBT association football players
Irish LGBT sportspeople
Lesbian sportswomen
Expatriate women's soccer players in the United States
Irish expatriate sportspeople in the United States
Clayton State Lakers athletes
Hutchinson Community College alumni